The Town of Windsor is a former local government area of Queensland, Australia, located in northern Brisbane.

History

On 11 February 1887, a portion of the Ithaca Division was proclaimed a municipality to be known as the Shire of Windsor.

On 10 February 1904, the shire was proclaimed the Town of Windsor.

On 1 October 1925, the town was amalgamated into the City of Brisbane.

Windsor Town Council Chambers

In the 1860s, local Brisbane tuff stone was extracted from a quarry at Windsor alongside Lutwyche Road. In 1897 the Windsor Shire Council built their Shire Chambers (later Town Chambers) at 356 Lutwyche Road (corner of Palmer Street), immediately beside the quarry using stone from the quarry.

After the amalgamation into City of Brisbane, the Windsor Town Council Chambers was used as storage and office space by the Brisbane City Council, which undertook a restoration of the building in 1987.

Today it is home to the Windsor and District Historical Society and the National Trust of Queensland; the public is welcome to visit.

The Windsor Town Council Chambers was listed on the Queensland Heritage Register in 1992.

Presidents and mayors
The presidents of the Windsor Shire Council were:
 1887: Matthew Rigby
 1888: Cornelius Ryan
 1889: Kenneth McLennan
 1890: Charles Birkbeck
 1891: George Jopp
 1892: John McIntyre
 1893: William Lane
 1894: Thomas Hawkins
 1895: William Mooney
 1896–1897: Hugh Cameron
 1898–1899: Kenneth McLennan (again) 
 1900: James Carroll
 1901: Angus Briscoe
 1902: Thomas Gardiner
 1903: Frederick Hart

The mayors of the Windsor Town Council were:
 1904: Kenneth McLennan (again)
 1905: Austin Graham
 1906: George Hewitt
 1907: James Price
 1908: William Bowser
 1909: Thomas Gardiner (again)
 1910: George Hewitt (again)
 1911: Arthur Bale
 1912: William Parsons
 1913: Thomas Gardiner (again)
 1914: William Clark
 1915: Charles Taylor
 1916: Robert Lane
 1917: Alex Inglis
 1918–1919: William Jolly
 1920: Robert Lane
 1921–1923: William Jolly (again)
 1924–1925: Henry Bond

References

External links
 

 
Former local government areas of Queensland
Windsor, Queensland
1925 disestablishments in Australia